Ange-Yoan Bonny (born 25 October 2003) is a French professional footballer who plays as a striker for Parma.

Career
Bonny made his professional debut with Châteauroux in a 2–1 Ligue 2 loss to AS Nancy on 31 October 2020.

On 31 August 2021, he joined Serie B side Parma.

References

External links
 
 

2003 births
Living people
People from Cherbourg-Octeville
French footballers
Association football defenders
Tours FC players
LB Châteauroux players
Parma Calcio 1913 players
Ligue 2 players
Championnat National 3 players
Expatriate footballers in Italy
Sportspeople from Manche
Footballers from Normandy